David M. Berson is Professor of Medical Science at Brown University. He helped lead the way in the discovery of a third class of mammalian photoreceptors by providing the first electrophysiological recordings from intrinsically photosensitive retinal ganglion cells.

References

Medical educators
American medical researchers
Brown University faculty
Living people
Year of birth missing (living people)